Grimsley may refer to:

Grimsley (surname)
Grimsley, Tennessee, unincorporated community
Grimsley Peaks, mountains of Antarctica
Mount Grimsley, mountain of Antarctica
Grimsley (Pokémon), character in the Pokémon media franchise
Grimsley High School, high school in Greensboro, North Carolina